The 1959 Alberta general election was held on June 18, 1959, to elect members of the Legislative Assembly of Alberta.

Ernest C. Manning, in his fifth election as party leader and provincial premier, led the Social Credit Party to its seventh consecutive term in government, with 55% of the popular vote, and all but four of the sixty five seats in the legislature.

Social Credit was also helped by a split in the opposition vote: whereas in the 1955 election, opponents were largely united behind the Liberal Party, in this election the vote was divided between the Liberals and the resurgent Progressive Conservative Party under the leadership of Cam Kirby, won almost 15% of the popular vote, placing ahead of the Liberals whose leader, Grant MacEwan lost  his Calgary seat.  The Tories and Liberals each won only one seat in the legislature while the Alberta CCF was shut out of the legislature for the first time in seventeen years. The other two opposition seat were taken by a Coalition candidate in Banff and an Independent Social Credit-er, both with strong local support.

Previous to this election, the Social Credit government had done away with the Instant-runoff voting system in use in the rural constituencies, and the Single Transferable Vote system in Edmonton and Calgary, both of which had been in place since 1924. The move was made, the government claimed, to prevent the waste of votes caused by votes being declared spoiled due to unsatisfactory ballot marking, to bring Alberta in line with the other provinces who were using the First past the post systems, and to stop what the government called  a conspiracy by the opposition parties to gang up on the SC government. The cancellation of STV and AV also standardized and simplified voting results across the province. Under single transferable vote and instant-runoff voting, final results would take up to five days to count the necessary vote transfers, before the last seat in a multiple-member district, Edmonton nor Calgary, was declared filled. (Manning always knew he was elected only hours after the polls closed due to his high vote count on the First Count.) The delay was especially large in the Edmonton, which elected seven members.
 
The 1955 election had produced a large opposition in the Legislature (large by Alberta standards anyway). Besides Liberals, Conservatives and CCF-ers electing MLAs in proportion to their numbers in the cities, the government had lost a few members in rural constituencies due to IRV, when they had received the largest portion of the vote in the constituency in the First Count (but not a majority) but were not elected to the seat due to another candidate receiving many vote transfers and eventually accumulating a majority of the vote themselves. The cancellation of IRV system in the rural districts was meant to prevent this in the future. The cancellation of STV in the cities gave the government a windfall of seats as well. SC candidates captured all the seats in Edmonton and all but one in Calgary although getting only 48 percent of the Edmonton city vote and only 54 percent of the Calgary vote.

Simultaneous with cancellation of STV/AV, the government increased the number of MLAs by creating new districts, the most since 1909, mostly in Calgary and Edmonton (two districts). One or more multi-member district had been used in each election since 1909, but in 1956 it was decided to start to use only single-member districts. This, in conjunction with the increase in the number of members, allowed drastic re-drawing of district boundaries, allowing the government to suit itself.

The change was met by some harsh criticism at the time. The government was accused of changing the rules to help itself and for failing to consult the public, but it did not hurt the government's popularity at the polls.

Electoral System 
Alberta's MLAs were elected through First-past-the-post voting in single-member districts.

Results

Results by riding

|-
|Acadia-Coronation|||
|Marion Kelts2,45057.34%
|
|
|
|James Leland Sims1,40832.95%
|
|Lester A. Lindgren4049.45%
|
||||
|
|-
|Alexandra|||
|Anders O. Aalborg2,35459.28%
|
|A.H. Sweet1,24831.43%
|
|Hilda A. Cross3589.02%
|
|
|
||||
|Anders O. Aalborg
|-
|Athabasca|||
|Antonio Aloisio2,33354.17%
|
|Robert Shopland70716.42%
|
|Richard Edward Hall1,06924.82%
|
|
|
|John Harry (Lab-Pro)1884.36%
||
|
|-
|Banff-Cochrane
|
|Robin W. Echlin2,20848.94%
|
|
|
|
|
|
||
|Francis Leo Gainer (Coal)2,27950.51%|||
|Francis Leo Gainer
|-
|Bonnyville|||
|Karl Earnest Nordstrom2,46551.50%
|
|Victor E. Justik86017.97%
|
|Jake Josvanger1,44730.23%
|
|
|
||||
|Jake Josvanger
|-
|Bow Valley-Empress|||
|William Delday2,86356.17%
|
|
|
|
|
|
|
|Bryce C. Stringam (Ind.)221343.42%
||
|Bryce C. Stringam
|-
|Bruce|||
|Earl M. Hardy2,32455.11%
|
|Clifford G. Patterson83319.75%
|
|Clare L. Liden53412.66%
|
|Edward I. Thompson51812.28%
|
||||
|
|-
|Calgary Bowness|||
|Charles E. Johnston6,68159.09%
|
|Bruce Norris3,19428.25%
|
|Evelyn Leew1,0189.00%
|
|Kay Halliday Grose3793.35%
|
||||
|
|-
|Calgary-Centre|||
|Frederick C. Colborne4,82453.69%
|
|Runo Carl Berglund2,64229.40%
|
|Gordon Arnell1,15412.84%
|
|Grant McHardy3493.88%
|
||||
|
|-
|Calgary-Glenmore
|
|A. Ross Lawson4,68140.58%|||
|Ernest S. Watkins4,89342.42%
|
|Reg. Clarkson1,91616.61%
|
|
|
||||
|
|-
|Calgary-North|||
|Rose Wilkinson6,65551.68%
|
|James David Macdonald3,38526.29%
|
|Grant MacEwan2,42918.86%
|
|Aylmer John Eggert Liesemer3742.90%
|
||||
|
|-
|Calgary-North East|||
|Albert W. Ludwig5,94564.02%
|
|Melvin P. Stronach1,82919.70%
|
|E. Kitch Elton1,06011.42%
|
|Jack Hampson4204.52%
|
||||
|
|-
|Calgary-South East|||
|Arthur J. Dixon5,64366.69%
|
|Ernest Henry Starr1,53718.16%
|
|Peter Petrasuk7929.36%
|
|George E. Ellinson4375.16%
|
||||
|
|-
|Calgary-West|||
|Donald S. Fleming5,06049.99%
|
|Roy Victor Deyell3,39233.51%
|
|Ted Duncan1,39713.80%
|
|Ken Tory2422.39%
|
||||
|
|-
|Camrose|||
|Chester I. Sayers3,22953.12%
|
|John E. Stuart1,63826.95%
|
|Stanley Ross Gould73212.04%
|
|Archie Olstad4687.70%
|
||||
|
|-
|Cardston|||
|Edgar W. Hinman2,20573.43%
|
|John A. Spencer79126.34%
|
|
|
|
|
||||
|Edgar W. Hinman
|-
|Clover Bar|||
|Floyd M. Baker3,39357.78%
|
|Andrew M. Adamson1,22520.86%
|
|Roy C. Marler93515.92%
|
|Ernest Wilfred Davies3105.28%
|
||||
|
|-
|Cypress|||
|Harry E. Strom3,19979.09%
|
|Wayne N. Anderson83120.54%
|
|
|
|
|
||||
|Harry E. Strom
|-
|Didsbury|||
|James Lawrence Owens3,04261.38%
|
|Douglas N. Munn1,35027.24%
|
|Walter P. Hourihan55611.22%
|
|
|
||||
|James Lawrence Owens
|-
|Drumheller|||
|Gordon Edward Taylor3,92283.84%
|
|Eneas A. Toshach74015.82%
|
|
|
|
|
||||
|Gordon Edward Taylor
|-
|Dunvegan|||
|Joseph M. Scruggs1,08038.72%
|
|Bennidict V. Griep66123.70%
|
|Steven P. Tachit64823.23%
|
|Floyd A. Johnson38313.73%
|
||||
|
|-
|Edmonton North|||
|Ethel Sylvia Wilson4,83152.92%
|
|John Verchomin3,35636.76%
|
|
|
|Peter Gomuwka8819.65%
|
||||
|
|-
|Edmonton-Centre|||
|Ambrose Holowach3,91246.53%
|
|Gerard Joseph Amerongen2,18525.99%
|
|Laurette C. Douglas1,68420.03%
|
|Robert Atkin5897.01%
|
||||
|
|-
|Edmonton-North East|||
|Lou W. Heard4,96049.52%
|
|Allan Welsh2,38923.85%
|
|Louis Marchand1,32513.23%
|
|Alex Goruk1,06310.61%
|
|William Harasym (Lab-Pro)2182.18%
||
|
|-
|Edmonton-North West|||
|Edgar H. Gerhart4,82342.63%
|
|Ned Feehan3,24928.72%
|
|Harper McCrae2,07118.31%
|
|James (Jim) Forest1,14610.13%
|
||||
|
|-
|Edmonton-Norwood|||
|William Tomyn5,07154.49%
|
|Nestor Marchyshyn1,48215.93%
|
|P.W. Bill Jones1,52216.36%
|
|Frank G. McCoy93210.02%
|
|William A. Tuomi (Lab-Pro)2512.70%
||
|
|-
|Edson|||
|Norman Alfred Willmore3,07456.84%
|
|Chris. H.R. Nielsen1,67831.03%
|
|Melvyn A. Parkyn63411.72%
|
|
|
||||
|Norman Alfred Willmore
|-
|Gleichen|||
|George E. Bell2,26759.94%
|
|A. John Van Wezel75419.94%
|
|Carman W. Ellis75219.88%
|
|
|
||||
|George E. Bell
|-
|Grande Prairie|||
|Ira McLaughlin4,21365.43%
|
|David T. Williamson1,39121.60%
|
|Mac Perkins81612.67%
|
|
|
||||
|Ira McLaughlin
|-
|Grouard|||
|Roy Ells3,72757.01%
|
|Paul Soulodre1,30920.02%
|
|Paul E. Maisonneuve1,47622.58%
|
|
|
||||
|
|-
|Hand Hills|||
|Clinton Keith French3,05265.99%
|
|William J. Newman1,07423.22%
|
|Val Gobel48910.57%
|
|
|
||||
|Wallace Warren Cross
|-
|Jasper-West|||
|Richard H. Jamieson5,04740.65%
|
|John Percy Page4,50736.30%
|
|Abe William Miller2,78222.41%
|
|
|
||||
|
|-
|Lac La Biche
|
|Elvin J. Woynarowich1,51841.27%
|
|Henry T. Thompson41111.17%|||
|Michael Maccagno1,73447.15%
|
|
|
||||
|Michael Maccagno
|-
|Lac Ste. Anne|||
|William Patterson2,28646.53%
|
|L.D. Gould1,12922.98%
|
|John A. Mills90718.46%
|
|Charley Keeley58211.85%
|
||||
|
|-
|Lacombe|||
|Allan Russell Patrick3,08963.42%
|
|Denis R. Stafford1,16223.86%
|
|
|
|Robert H. Carlyle62012.73%
|
||||
|Allan Russell Patrick
|-
|Leduc
|
|
|
|Peter Wyllie1,49433.11%
|
|
|
|Andrew Simon Borys67614.98%|||
|Ronald Earl Ansley (Ind. SoCred)2,33451.73%|||
|
|-
|Lethbridge|||
|John C. Landeryou7,25061.77%
|
|Thomas Spanos2,91724.85%
|
|Robery Henry Jeacock1,52512.99%
|
|
|
||||
|John C. Landeryou
|-
|Little Bow|||
|Peter Dawson2,93964.71%
|
|Bernard W. Tonken98921.77%
|
|Donald A. McNiven60313.28%
|
|
|
||||
|Peter Dawson
|-
|Macleod|||
|James Hartley3,73172.12%
|
|Leo E. Toone94918.35%
|
|Dennis Arthur Mouser4759.18%
|
|
|
||||
|James Hartley
|-
|Medicine Hat|||
|Elizabeth G. Robinson5,60464.87%
|
|John H. Cocks1,78020.60%
|
|Norma DeMan5976.91%
|
|John D. Rogers4955.73%
|
||||
|Elizabeth G. Robinson
|-
|Okotoks-High River|||
|Ernest G. Hansell2,64251.42%
|
|James S. McLeod1,06920.81%
|
|
|
|
|
|Ross Laird Ellis (Ind.)1,42727.77%
||
|Ross Laird Ellis
|-
|Olds|||
|Roderick Angus Macleod3,42466.29%
|
|Bruce Hanson1,72833.46%
|
|
|
|
|
||||
|Roderick Angus Macleod
|-
|Peace River|||
|William F. Gilliland2,86460.64%
|
|Harold C. Sissons1,19025.20%
|
|James Mann65013.76%
|
|
|
||||
|William F. Gilliland
|-
|Pembina|||
|Robin D. Jorgenson3,43661.50%
|
|Frie Bredo1,70830.57%
|
|Gustav Wahl4167.45%
|
|
|
||||
|Robin D. Jorgenson
|-
|Pincher Creek-Crowsnest|||
|William A. Kovach3,14566.89%
|
|Alex Grant1,13324.10%
|
|C. Boyden4108.72%
|
|
|
||||
|William A. Kovach
|-
|Ponoka|||
|Glen F. Johnston2,40649.88%
|
|Ivor E. Davies1,52931.70%
|
|Erwin E. Schultz86017.83%
|
|
|
||||
|
|-
|Red Deer|||
|William Kenneth Ure6,69163.61%
|
|William J. Cameron "Cam" Kirby3,79736.10%
|
|
|
|
|
||||
|
|-
|Redwater|||
|John Dubetz2,09249.05%
|
|Martha P. Bielish90121.13%
|
|Alfred Macyk1,26229.59%
|
|
|
||||
|
|-
|Rocky Mountain House|||
|Alfred J. Hooke3,23574.45%
|
|
|
|Tom Bert66015.19%
|
|Raymond E. Schmidt43710.06%
|
||||
|Alfred J. Hooke
|-
|Sedgewick|||
|Jack C. Hillman2,80562.75%
|
|Kenneth M. Geddes79617.81%
|
|Mildred G. Redman54112.10%
|
|Arthur C. Bunney3197.14%
|
||||
|Jack C. Hillman
|-
|Spirit River|||
|Adolph O. Fimrite3,01063.68%
|
|Charles J. Stojan1,05922.40%
|
|
|
|James W. Graham59312.54%
|
|C.J. Lampert (Ind. SoCred)581.23%|||
|Adolph O. Fimrite
|-
|St. Albert|||
|Keith Everitt2,15736.28%
|
|Stanley M. Walker1,18719.96%
|
|Arthur J. Soetaert2,08235.02%
|
|Earl Toane4737.95%
|
||||
|
|-
|St. Paul|||
|Raymond Reierson3,41268.38%
|
|Gordon Shave53410.70%
|
|J. Van Brabant1,03420.72%
|
|
|
||||
|Raymond Reierson
|-
|Stettler|||
|Galen C. Norris3,15060.71%
|
|Gordon Taylor99119.10%
|
|Henry Kroeger72113.89%
|
|Alice Ness2975.72%
|
||||
|Galen C. Norris
|-
|Stony Plain|||
|Cornelia R. Wood2,88046.25%
|
|Robert K. Clarkson1,22719.70%
|
|John Harold McLaughlin2,09133.58%
|
|
|
||||
|John Harold McLaughlin
|-
|Strathcona Centre|||
|Joseph Donovan Ross4,56453.81%
|
|Pat Walsh2,22626.25%
|
|Leslie M. Lyons1,21514.33%
|
|Keith Wright4224.98%
|
||||
|
|-
|Strathcona East|||
|Ernest C. Manning7,33749.62%
|
|James E. Simpson3,81225.78%
|
|George Johnson2,61017.65%
|
|Hugh Smith9996.76%
|
||||
|
|-
|Strathcona West|||
|Randolph H. McKinnon3,63941.63%
|
|Eric M. Duggan2,68330.69%
|
|Frank J. Edwards1,98222.67%
|
|H. Douglas Trace4234.84%
|
||||
|
|-
|Taber|||
|Roy S. Lee3,67877.64%
|
|Leslie P. Cluff1,03721.89%
|
|
|
|
|
||||
|Roy S. Lee
|-
|Vegreville|||
|Alex W. Gordey2,24847.63%
|
|Joseph M. Melnychuk53111.25%
|
|John Koshuta67614.32%
|
|Stanley N. Ruzycki1,25326.55%
|
||||
|
|-
|Vermilion|||
|Ashley H. Cooper2,20449.35%
|
|D.J. Frunchak79917.89%
|
|Russell James Whitson1,22427.41%
|
|
|
|John P. Hocaluk (Lab-Pro)2275.08%
||
|
|-
|Wainwright|||
|Henry A. Ruste3,11164.76%
|
|Donald Mills83117.30%
|
|Henry D. Frizzell57211.91%
|
|John Wesley Connelly2745.70%
|
||||
|Henry A. Ruste
|-
|Warner|||
|Leonard C. Halmrast2,43072.52%
|
|
|
|Mark R. Stringam91527.31%
|
|
|
||||
|Leonard C. Halmrast
|-
|Wetaskiwin|||
|John A. Wingblade3,35258.12%
|
|Robert D. Angus1,01017.51%
|
|Fred R. MacNaughton64211.13%
|
|David Pat. Garland74912.99%
|
||||
|
|-
|Willingdon|||
|Nicholas A. Melnyk2,42163.13%
|
|Alex Hushlak99125.84%
|
|
|
|Nick W. Svekla39210.22%
|
||||
|
|-
|}

See also
List of Alberta political parties

References

1959 elections in Canada
1959
June 1959 events in Canada
1959 in Alberta